Coleophora aegyptiacae is a moth of the family Coleophoridae. It is found on the Canary Islands (Tenerife, Fuerteventura) and in Morocco, Algeria, Tunisia, Libya, Saudi Arabia, Israel, the Palestinian Territories and Iran, Oman and Yemen.

The larvae feed on the leaves Salvia aegyptiaca. They live in a case.

References

aegyptiacae
Moths described in 1907
Moths of Africa
Moths of Asia